Nathan King (born 29 August 1970) is an English rock musician. Currently a member of Level 42, King has performed with Frost*, It Bites, and The Blockheads. He is the younger brother of Level 42's Mark King.

King is also a contributor to the "All About the Bass" series on the Andertons TV YouTube channel.

References

1970 births
Living people
English rock guitarists
It Bites members
Frost* members
Level 42 members
The Blockheads members
Musicians from the Isle of Wight
Musicians from London
21st-century British guitarists